Illawarra Sports High School is a government-funded co-educational comprehensive and specialist secondary day school, with speciality in sports, located in Berkeley, a southern suburb of Wollongong, in the Illawarra region of New South Wales, Australia.

Established in 1956 as the Berkeley High School, the school changed its name in 1998 in line with becoming a sports-oriented school. The Illawarra Sports High School caters for approximately 740 students in 2018, from Year 7 to Year 12, of whom 13 percent identified as Indigenous Australians and 27 percent were from a language background other than English. The school draws the majority of its students from the southern Wollongong area; with an increasing number of students from the larger Illawarra area who access its specialist sports programs. The school is operated by the New South Wales Department of Education; the principal is Gary Hampton.

Illawarra Sports High School is a member of the NSW Sports High Schools Association.

Sports offered 
The Illawarra Sports High School operates a talented sports development program across the following sports: basketball, boxing, hockey, netball, rugby league, rugby union, soccer (affiliated with the Sydney FC), surfing, touch football, and wrestling.

Notable alumni

 Caitlin Foordsoccer player, played with the Matildas and Sydney FC
 Tyson Frizellrugby league footballer; played with the Cronulla-Sutherland Sharks, St. George Illawarra Dragons, Newcastle Knights, Wales, and Australian Schoolboys in rugby union
 Ryan Gregsonmiddle-distance runner; represented Australia at the 2012 Olympics
 Keith Luliarugby league footballer; played with the St. George Illawarra Dragons, Newcastle Knights, Bradford Bulls, and Wests Tigers
 Trent Merrinrugby league footballer; played with the St George Illawarra Dragons and New South Wales State of Origin
 Les Murray former broadcaster, sports journalist and analyst
 Brett Stewartrugby league footballer; played with the Manly Sea Eagles, New South Wales State of Origin, and Kangaroos
 Glenn Stewartrugby league footballer; played with the Manly Sea Eagles, New South Wales State of Origin, and Kangaroos
 Maddison Weatherallwomen's rugby league footballer; plays for St George Illawarra Dragons
 Jayden Sullivanrugby league footballer; plays for St George Illawarra Dragons

See also 

 List of government schools in New South Wales
 List of schools in Illawarra and the South East (New South Wales)
 Selective school (New South Wales)
 Education in Australia

References

External links
 

Educational institutions established in 1956
1956 establishments in Australia
Public high schools in New South Wales
Schools in Wollongong
Selective schools in New South Wales
Sports schools in Australia